Rowdy Aliya is a 2004 Kannada comedy - action film directed and written by Om Sai Prakash and produced by Neha. The film features Shiva Rajkumar and Priyanka Trivedi in the lead roles along with Jaimala and Chaya Singh in other pivotal roles.

The film featured original score and soundtrack composed and written by a team of 7 composers. Though the 2003 movie Sri Ram was announced as Shiva Rajkumar's 75th movie, this movie became the 75th movie in the order of release.

Cast 

 Shiva Rajkumar as Raja
 Priyanka Upendra as Rani
 Jayamala as Malini Devi
 Chaya Singh
 Sharan
 Doddanna
 Sadhu Kokila
 Ashok
 Ramesh Bhat
 Chitra Shenoy
 Avinash
 Ashalatha
 M. S. Umesh
 Rekha Das

Soundtrack 
The music was composed by seven music directors, including Koti, Sadhu Kokila, Rajesh Ramanath, K. Kalyan, Babji-Sandeep, Srishaila and Vandemataram Srinivas. The singers were largely notable Bollywood singers apart from Shivarajkumar himself singing a track.

References

External links 

 2004 year roundup
 Unique promotion for Rowdy Aliya

2004 films
2000s Kannada-language films
Indian action comedy films
Films scored by Koti
Films scored by Rajesh Ramnath
Films scored by K. Kalyan
Films scored by Vandemataram Srinivas
Films scored by Sadhu Kokila
Films directed by Sai Prakash
2004 action comedy films